Salpixantha is a genus of flowering plants belonging to the family Acanthaceae.

Species
Its native range is Jamaica.

Species:
 Salpixantha coccinea Hook.

References

Acanthaceae
Acanthaceae genera